The Boeing Cargo Air Vehicle is an unmanned, autonomously flying, fully electric cargo air vehicle (CAV).  It was made possible by an investment of Boeing HorizonX Ventures.

Development
At the beginning it was remote control-operated. Later it flew autonomously. The first flight tests have been in 2017. The CAV is for research of autonomy technology for aerospace vehicles in the future. In Boeing's Ridley Park wind tunnel flight tests have been finished. It was flying indoor in 2018 before outdoor flights in 2019. With the Boeing CAV there are new possibilities for the transport of time-sensitive and high-value goods and to conduct autonomous missions in remote or dangerous environments. Its configuration evolved to six dual-rotor systems with 12 propellers and the first outdoor flights tests were done by May 2019, including forward flight transition. 

By September 2020, Boeing was to close its Boeing NeXt division, in response to financial losses in the wake of the 737 MAX groundings and the impact of the COVID-19 pandemic on aviation.

Design
The CAV was designed and built by 50 engineers in less than three months.

Specifications

Similar types 
 Microdrone

Related developments 
 Natilus

See also 

 List of electric aircraft

References

External links 
 
 

2010s United States experimental aircraft
Electric aircraft
VTOL aircraft
Electric helicopters
Aircraft first flown in 2018
Boeing eVTOL